Simeon Hempsall (20 November 1969) is a former racing cyclist who competed in the road race at the 1992 Olympic Games in Barcelona and finished 36th of 84. He also competed in the 1994 Commonwealth Games. Hempsall rode as a professional between 1994 and 1998.

He is now an osteopath in Sheffield and Chesterfield.

Major results

1986
 1st  Road race, National Junior Road Championships
1990
 1st  Road race, National Amateur Road Championships
 1st Stage 7b Tour du Hainaut
 2nd Overall Premier Calendar
1991
 1st Stage 3 Circuit Franco-Belge
 2nd Overall Milk Race
1st Stage 2
 3rd Road race, National Amateur Road Championships
 3rd Manx Trophy
1993
 1st Paris–Troyes
1994
 1st Manx Trophy
 1st Overall Tour of the Peak
 2nd Overall Premier Calendar
 2nd Overall  Girvan 3-day
1st Stage 1

References

1969 births
Living people
Cyclists from Yorkshire
British cycling road race champions
Sportspeople from Sheffield
Olympic cyclists of Great Britain
Cyclists at the 1992 Summer Olympics